The Riachuelo Formation is a geologic formation of the Early to Late Cretaceous (Late Aptian to Cenomanian) age in northeastern Brazil's Sergipe-Alagoas Basin. It is the first Formation of the Basin to contain sediments deposited under fully marine conditions. The formation is subdivided into three members: Angico, Taquari and Maruim.

The formation has provided fossils of ammonites, gastropods, bivalves, brachiopods, serpulids, equinoderms, ostracoids, radiolarians, lobsters and Crabs. Several fish species reported from the Santana Formation also occur in this formation, namely: Cladocyclus gardneri, Neoproscinetes penalvai, Notelops brama, Rhacolepis buccalis, Tharrhias araripis and Vinctifer comptoni. Santanichthys diasii is also reported from the Taquari Member of the Riachuelo Formation. Teeth and vertebrae of elasmobranchii have also been found in the formation.

Description 
The Riachuelo Formation is a 500 metres (1,600 ft) thick mix of Aptian and Albian sediments formed by high-energy shelf carbonate deposits (oncolitic-oolitic-peloidal-bioclastic packstones and grainstones), interbedded with lagoonal mudstones and siltstones, and fan-delta like siliciclastic rocks. It overlies Muribeca Formation and underlies the Cotinguiba Formation. The formation sprouts in a track approximately 20 km wide and it extends itself between the cities of Itaporanga d’Ajuda and Pacatuba. It also has outcrops in the cities of Riachuelo, Santa Rosa de Lima, Divina Pastora, Laranjeiras, Rosário do Catete, Maruim, General Maynard and Carmópolis.

There are three members of this formation: Angico Member, whose environment has been interpreted as costal areas consisting of the basin margins and grabens, deltaic fans formed, and the coarse sediments they carried, the Maruim Member, in the lower sedimentation areas,with carbonate ramps and dolomitized oolite/oncolite banks deposited under fluctuating sea level conditions, and the Taquari Member, corresponding to calcareous mudstone and shale from lagoonal and slope environments.

Ammonites are particularly plentiful and have provided a firm biocronostratigraphic control for the basin. The succession of ammonites is divided in five zones: The Epicheloniceras-Diadochoceras-Eodouvilleiceras zone, from the Aptian, the Douvilleiceras zone, from the lower Albian, the Oxytropidoceras zone, from the middle Albian, and the Elobiceras and Mortoniceras-Neokentroceras zones, both from the late Albian.

History 
The name Riachuelo Formation was used for the first time in the geological literature by Moraes Rego in 1929. Then, in 1959, Bender made a new interpretation, separating the upper part of the Riachuelo Formation from the lower one, naming it Maruim. This lower unit described by Bender was considered by Beurlen K. in 1963 as only one facies of the Riachuelo-Maruim Complex. In 1970, Schaller analyzed the unit again and segmenting it into four members: Angico, Taquari, Maruim and Aguilhada. Feijó, in 1994, classified the formation as a siliciclastic-carbonatic platform complex and divided it into the members: Angico, Taquari and Maruim, which is the classification currently used.

Fossil content

Molluscs

Echinoderms

Annelids

Crustaceans

Fishes

References 

Geologic formations of Brazil
Cretaceous Brazil
Aptian
Albian
Cenomanian